Fedir Trokhymovych Dyachenko (16 June 1917 – 8 August 1995), was a Ukrainian-born Russian Soviet sniper during World War II, credited with as many as 583 kills. He was born in the village of Velyki Krynky, now part of Hlobyne Raion of Poltava Oblast. 

Dyachenko was one of the most effective snipers in the Red Army during World War II. He was granted the status of Hero of the Soviet Union in 1944.

He retired from the Soviet Army in 1962 with the rank of Major. He lived in Leningrad, working as a senior engineer at the Kirov Plant. Dyachenko died on 8 August 1995 and is buried in the city's Kovalevsky Cemetery.

References

Literature 
 The History of Sniping and Sharpshooting by Major John L Plaster, USAR
 Heroines of the Soviet Union 1941–45 Henry Sakaida (p. 20)

External links 
 Soviet snipers/Fedir Dyachenko (ru)

1917 births
1995 deaths
People from Poltava Oblast
Heroes of the Soviet Union
Soviet military snipers
Soviet military personnel of World War II
Recipients of the Order of Lenin
Recipients of the Order of the Red Banner
Recipients of the Medal "For Courage" (Russia)
Ukrainian military snipers
Ukrainian people of World War II
Soviet military personnel of World War II from Ukraine